Kirat Rai Yayokkha (Nepali: किरात राई यायोक्खा) is a social organization of the  Rai people, an indigenous ethnic group in Nepal that established in 1990 (2047 B.S.) The word "Kirat" describes the ancient tribes of Nepal, while "Rai" is the name of one of the Kirat ethnic groups. Rai are the native or indigenous people of east Nepal.

The mission of Kirat Rai Yayokkha is to maintain social integrity and acquire equality and justice by protecting, preserving and promoting distinct social and cultural identity and linguistic diversity of Kirat Rai. Kirat Rai Yayokkha is a non-profit, non-political and non-governmental organization.

Branches also exist in other countries. The United Kirat Rai Organization of America was formed in 2007. The Bhutanese Kirat Rai Organization of America, Inc. was formed in 2014.

See also
 Kirat
 Rai people

External links
  Kirat Rai Yayokkha Central Committee, Nepal
 Kirat Rai Yayokkha UK, 
 Akhil Kirat Rai Sangh Sikkim, India
 United Kirat Rai Organization of America, USA
 Kirat Rai Yayokkha, Hong Kong
 Kirat Welfare Society, Nepal
 Online Library about kirat history and culture
 Kirat Rai Yayokhkha Branch-UAE
 Bhutanese Kirat Rai Organization of America, Inc..           
 Official Website ofKiratii Khambu Rai Sanskritik Sansthan Bagdogra Indiahttp://www.kiratraibagdogra.org/

Indigenous organisations in Nepal
1990 establishments in Nepal